Gulf Conformity mark, also known as G-mark is a certification mark used to indicate products that conform to all technical regulations of the Gulf Cooperation Council. It means that the G-marked products meet all requirements of the corresponding technical regulations and have passed all conformity assessment procedures. The mark was introduced in 2009.

References

Certification marks